Richard Raymond Simon (born September 21, 1933) is retired American auto racing driver and racing team owner. Simon drove Indy cars in USAC and CART, and made 17 starts at the Indianapolis 500. At the 1988 Indianapolis 500, Simon set a record as the oldest driver in Indy 500 history (54 years, 251 days), a record that was later broken by A. J. Foyt.

Simon was a longtime car owner, founding Dick Simon Racing, helping to begin the Indy car careers of Stéphan Grégoire, Arie Luyendyk, Raul Boesel, Lyn St. James, and many others. Simon had a notable record at the Indy 500. Of the many rookies he entered at Indy over the years, not a single one failed to qualify for the race. Simon never won a race as a driver or as an owner. His best finish as a driver was 3rd at Ontario, and as an owner he had six second place finishes. Simon had a best finish at the Indianapolis 500 of 6th in 1987 (as a driver), and 4th in 1993 as an owner with Boesel. 

Simon sold his race team to Andy Evans who formed Team Scandia in 1997. He returned to Indy car racing in the late 1990s and entered cars in 2000 and 2001.

Driving career

Simon was born in Sandy, Utah, and made his first driving appearance at Pacific Raceways in October 1969, but he failed to qualify. Simon was an adventurist and enthusiast. He was an experienced skier, scuba diver, registered pilot, sky diver, and parachutist. He was a national champion parachute jumper, and made over 1,600 jumps during the 1960s. In 1970, he left a desk job at an insurance company to pursue a career in auto racing.

Simon made his racing debut in 1970 driving a second-hand Vollstedt chassis at Phoenix International Raceway but was sidelined by magneto failure after only 4 laps. He made his Indianapolis 500 debut that year and finished 14th position. At Ontario Motor Speedway that September, Simon captured his career-best finish of 3rd place and he finished 10th in the 1970 USAC National Championship. Simon would continue to be marginally competitive throughout the 1970s, never matching his finishes of the 1970 season. In 1979, Simon sided with USAC during its split with CART. In being one of the few drivers to complete the USAC schedule, Simon finished 8th in the Championship. In 1980 Simon moved to CART and continued to have little success throughout the 1980s while remaining marginally competitive. He logged his best CART season in 1987 when he made 11 starts and logged two top-tens including a 6th place at the Indy 500, good enough for 20th in the CART championship. A partial season in 1988 where Simon logged a solid 9th-place finish in the Indy 500 was his last as a driver.

Simon's driving career includes 183 starts (115 in USAC, 78 in CART) over 19 seasons spanning from 1970 to 1988. Among those starts are 17 Indianapolis 500 appearances.  He completed 1,954 laps in the Indianapolis 500 without leading any, the second highest total ever.

Team ownership

Dick Simon fielded his own race team beginning in 1983 and shortly thereafter began fielding cars for pay drivers, Dick Simon Racing being one of the most competitive teams offering race seats to such drivers almost always fielded current-year March and Lola chassis and had a competitive engine package. In 1989 the team fielded two fully funded drivers in Scott Brayton and Arie Luyendyk as the team moved towards the front of the pack. Simon fielded a car in the 1992 Indianapolis 500 for Lyn St. James who became the second woman to drive in the race. Raul Boesel finished 5th in points with three runner-up finishes in 1993, the team's best season result. The team had a difficult 1995 and Simon sold the team to Andy Evans who turned it into Team Scandia. Simon returned to ownership in the Indy Racing League IndyCar Series in 1999 but saw little success. The team was shut down after the team's driver Stéphan Grégoire failed to qualify for the 2001 Indianapolis 500.

Personal life
Dick Simon was once questioned by the FBI under the suspicion of being the airplane hijacker D. B. Cooper. He proved that he was discussing sponsorship with the president of General Foods in Upstate New York on the date of the hijack.

Motorsports career results

SCCA National Championship Runoffs

American open-wheel racing
(key) (Races in bold indicate pole position)

USAC Championship Car

PPG Indy Car World Series

Indianapolis 500

NASCAR
(key) (Bold - Pole position awarded by qualifying time. Italics - Pole position earned by points standings or practice time. * – Most laps led.)

Winston Cup Series

Daytona 500

References

External links
Article at latimes.com
Dick Simon - 80th Birthday - Indy Racing Years Photo Album
Dick Simon - 80th Birthday - Indy Racing Years Video Album:

1933 births
Living people
Racing drivers from Utah
Champ Car drivers
Indianapolis 500 drivers
IndyCar Series team owners
People from Sandy, Utah
SCCA National Championship Runoffs participants